Vidas em Jogo (English: Lives at Stake, International Title: Jackpot!) is a Brazilian primetime telenovela created by Cristianne Fridman and directed by Alexandre Avancini.

The series premiered on May 3, 2011 and ended on April 9, 2012 on Rede Record at the 10 p.m. timeslot.

A total of 245 episodes of 45 minutes were produced. Due to the 2011 Pan American Games, Vidas em Jogo was preempted on October 14 and 30, so  when first shown in Brazil, episodes 242–245 were shown as a separate 90-minute two episodes. In other countries, these final four episodes were aired separately.

Plot
A group of friends had been playing the lottery for two years ago. On New Year's Eve, when the prize has an extraordinary value, they picked the correct numbers of the lottery and they all become millionaires.

They live their dreams but they are also involved in a terrible nightmare because they made a pact: each one has a mission to accomplish within one year and only those who can accomplish their mission shall be entitled to the other half of the prize that is stored in a saving account.

The conflicts get worse when the friends that won the lottery start to die mysteriously and the winners enter in a game of life or death in which, if they don't discover who the murderer is, they may be the next victim.

Cast

Main cast

Recurring cast

References

External links 
 

Brazilian telenovelas
2011 Brazilian television series debuts
2012 Brazilian television series endings
2011 telenovelas
RecordTV telenovelas
Portuguese-language telenovelas